David Steele may refer to:
David Steele (minister) (1803–1887), Irish-born American theologian and Covenanter minister
David Steele (cricketer, born 1869) (1869–1935), English-born Scottish cricketer
David Steele (footballer) (1894–1964), Scottish football player and manager
David Steele (historian) (1934–2019), British historian
David Steele (cricketer) (born 1941), English cricketer
David Steele (sports announcer) (born 1953), American TV and radio sportscaster and play-by-play TV announcer
David Steele (musician) (born 1960), British bassist for The Beat and Fine Young Cannibals
Dave Steele (1974–2017), American race car driver
David Ramsay Steele, Libertarian author

See also
David Steel (disambiguation)
 Steele (surname)